Hele is a township-level division in the county-level city of Wanning in southeast Hainan, China.

See also

List of township-level divisions of Hainan
 Hainan cuisine#Hele crab, a local crab dish

References

Township-level divisions of Hainan